Rear-Admiral George Stephen Ritchie CB DSC (30 October 1914 – 8 May 2012) was a British admiral noted for his cartographic and hydrographic work.

Naval career
Ritchie was born in Burnley, 1914, of Scottish parents, Sir Douglas Ritchie and Lady Margaret Stephen Ritchie. He was educated at the Royal Naval College, Dartmouth from the age of 13, from where he went to sea at the age of 17. In 1936 he joined the Surveying Service, being appointed to the old coal-burning surveying ship, operating in the South China Sea.

During the Second World War the then Lieutenant Ritchie was awarded the Distinguished Service Cross (DSC) for bravery whilst surveying beaches in North Africa behind the enemy lines.

In 1951 on the survey ship HMS Challenger, recorded the deepest part of the ocean trench depth Challenger Deep of 5,960 fathoms (10,900 m, 35,761 ft) using echo sounding. He was awarded the Royal Geographical Society's Back Award in 1954.

In 1966 he was promoted to the rank of rear admiral and appointed to the post of Hydrographer of the Navy which he held for five years, responsible for the operations of the RN Surveying Squadron and the publication of the Admiralty Chart worldwide series. In the same year he received a Companion of the Bath. In 1967 he published The Admiralty Chart, a history of British Naval Hydrography in the Nineteenth Century

Post naval career
After 18 months as a senior research fellow at Southampton University, he was elected first in 1972 and again in 1977 as president of the International Hydrographic Bureau, thus spending 10 years in the Principality of Monaco, in the service of the then 50 Member States of the International Hydrographic Organization.

Admiral Ritchie received the Founder's Medal of the Royal Geographical Society, the Gold Medal of the Royal Institute of Navigation (he was president from 1970 to 1972), the Silver Medal of the Royal Society of Arts and the Prix Manley-Bendall from the Academie de Marine. He was an honorary member of the Challenger Society for Marine Science and an Emeritus Member of the Hydrographic Society.

After his return from Monaco he lived with his wife, Disa, in the family house built by his grandfather in the fishing village of Collieston, Aberdeenshire. He published other titles including Challenger - The Life of a Survey Ship (1957), The Admiralty Chart (1967), No Day too Long: An Hydrographer’s Tale (1992) and As it Was (2003). He wrote a regular column describing how hydrography used to be, for the international publication Hydro International from 1985–1995.

In 2009 he donated his collection on the history of hydrography to the Robinson Library at Newcastle University.

He died on 8 May 2012 in Collieston, Aberdeenshire.

Notes

External links
 Boesjes, Johan et al. (October 2004) "Steve Ritchie - A Living Legend"  Hydro International 8(8):

1914 births
2012 deaths
Companions of the Order of the Bath
English hydrographers
Hydrographers of the Royal Navy
Recipients of the Distinguished Service Cross (United Kingdom)
Royal Navy rear admirals
Royal Navy officers of World War II